This is a list of the past and present mayors of Medford, Massachusetts.

Mayors

City managers
From 1950 to 1988, an appointed city manager served as the chief administrative manager of the city.

References

Lists of Massachusetts politicians
Medford